St Matthew's Church (formerly All Saints' Church) is a Church of England parish church in Walsall, West Midlands, England. It was rebuilt in 1820-1821 by Francis Goodwin,  but includes remains of the earlier church built around 1220 and dedicated to All Saints. It is a Grade II* listed building, and on Historic England's Heritage at Risk Register.  The church was rededicated to St Matthew when rebuilt. The church is the oldest building in Walsall and serves as the main parish church of the town. It sits at a high elevation above the town on a hill and can be seen when entering the town.

The first Rector, Magister Serlo De Sunning, was appointed by King John in 1211. From 1248 until 1538 appointments of Rector were given to Halesowen Abbey. Since then, appointments were made by the Earl of Bradford and transferred to the Bishop of Lichfield in 1945.

The east window commemorates Sister Dora and the stained glass is the work of Burlison and Grylls.

References

Churches completed in 1821
Walsall, St Matthew
Walsall, St Matthew
Buildings and structures in Walsall